John Arneil (1862 – 11 August 1938) was a New Zealand cricketer who played nine first-class matches for the Auckland between 1882 and 1894.

He was also a rugby union player and administrator. He had the rare distinction of captaining Auckland teams at both rugby and cricket. He was a prolific batsman in Auckland club and representative cricket despite being unable to practise owing to his hours of work. In 1883-84 he made 59 not out, the top score of the match and of his first-class career, when Auckland chased a target of 152 in the second innings and he steered them to a four-wicket victory over Canterbury.

He married Emily Caradus in 1891. They had three sons and a daughter.

See also
 List of Auckland representative cricketers

References

1862 births
1938 deaths
Indian emigrants to New Zealand
People educated at Auckland Grammar School
New Zealand cricketers
Auckland cricketers
Auckland rugby union players